David's Airport , also known as David's Field, is a privately owned, public-use airport located in Branch County, Michigan, United States. It is two miles (3 km) south of the central business district of Athens, a village in Calhoun County.  David's Field was built shortly after World War II by John Broberg and named to honor his twin brother who was killed on Okinawa.  John operated the field intermittently into the 1970s where he conducted flight training and parachute practice operations.

Facilities and aircraft 
For the 12-month period ending December 31, 2005, the airport had 1,000 general aviation aircraft operations, an average of 83 per month.

References

External links 

Airports in Michigan
Buildings and structures in Branch County, Michigan
Defunct airports in Michigan
Transportation in Branch County, Michigan